is a Japanese professional basketball executive and former player, currently serving as the general manager of the Akita Northern Happinets of the Japanese B.League.

References

1973 births
Living people
Japanese men's basketball players
Sportspeople from Akita Prefecture